Anzac railway station (originally known by the working title of Domain) is a railway station currently under construction as part of the Metro Tunnel. The station is named for the nearby Shrine of Remembrance and in honour of the Anzac spirit of service and sacrifice. It is being built using the cut-and-cover method. Construction on the station commenced in 2018 and is expected to open in 2025.

Location
Anzac station is being built below St Kilda Road in the suburb of South Yarra, and is planned to feature four entrances.

Anzac Precinct
The station will also feature the first platform-to-platform connection between trains and trams in Melbourne, as half of all passengers are expected to interchange between the two modes of transport. The Anzac Station tram stop opened to passengers on the 19 December 2022, although a major tram stop known as Domain Interchange existed on the same site prior to Metro Tunnel construction. The train station underneath remains under construction.

During the construction period the Domain Road tram line, Domain Interchange tram stop was demolished and rebuilt as Anzac Station.

The station entrance features a large wooden canopy designed by Hassell, Weston Williamson and RSHP.

Station layout

Transport links

Yarra Trams operates eight routes via the tram/train interchange
: Melbourne University – Malvern East (operates as 3a on weekends and public holidays)
: Melbourne University – Malvern
: Moreland – Glen Iris
: Melbourne University – Kew
: West Coburg – Toorak
: Melbourne University – Brighton East
: Melbourne University – Carnegie
: Melbourne University – Camberwell

Gallery

References

External links

Proposed railway stations in Melbourne
Railway stations scheduled to open in 2025
Railway stations located underground in Melbourne
Railway stations in the City of Melbourne (LGA)

ANZAC (Australia)